{{Infobox album
| name       = Wild One: The Very Best of Thin Lizzy
| type       = greatest
| artist     = Thin Lizzy
| cover      = Thinlizzywildone.jpg
| alt        =
| released   = January 9, 1996
| recorded   = 1972–1984
| venue      =
| studio     =
| genre      = Hard rock, blues rock
| length     = 76:30
| label      = Vertigo / Mercury| producer   =
| chronology = Thin Lizzy compilation albums
| prev_title = The Rocker
| prev_year  = 1994
| next_title = Whiskey in the Jar
| next_year  = 1996
}}Wild One: The Very Best of Thin Lizzy''  is a 1996 compilation album by Irish rock band Thin Lizzy. It was released ten years after the death of frontman Phil Lynott in 1986 as a tribute to him.

Although the album shares its title with the Thin Lizzy song of the same name, and also quotes the chorus of the song on the back of the album, the song itself is not actually included. A limited two-CD edition of the album was also released, containing rare live tracks from various limited edition releases throughout the band's career on the second disc.

Track listing
All songs written by Phil Lynott unless stated.

Disc 1
"The Boys Are Back in Town"
"Jailbreak"
"Don't Believe a Word"
"Waiting for an Alibi"
"Rosalie/Cowgirl's Song" (live) (Bob Seger, Lynott, Brian Downey)
"Cold Sweat" (Lynott, John Sykes)
"Thunder and Lightning" (Downey, Lynott)
"Out in the Fields"* (Gary Moore)
"Dancin' in the Moonlight"
"Parisienne Walkways"* (Lynott, Moore)
"Sarah" (Lynott, Moore)
"Still in Love with You" (live)
"Emerald"  (Scott Gorham, Brian Robertson, Downey, Lynott)
"Bad Reputation" (Downey, Gorham, Lynott)
"Killer on the Loose"
"Chinatown" (Downey, Gorham, Lynott, Snowy White)
"Do Anything You Want To"
"The Rocker" (Lynott, Eric Bell, Downey)
"Whiskey in the Jar" (Trad. arr. Lynott, Bell, Downey)

*"Out in the Fields" and "Parisienne Walkways" were originally released as a Gary Moore & Phil Lynott track and a Gary Moore solo track, respectively.

Disc 2 (Limited Edition)
All of the tracks on the bonus disc are live recordings.
"Bad Reputation" (Gorham, Downey, Lynott)
"Opium Trail" (Gorham, Downey, Lynott)
"Are You Ready" (Gorham, Robertson, Downey, Lynott)
"Dear Miss Lonely Hearts" (Jimmy Bain, Lynott)
"Chinatown" (Downey, Gorham, Lynott, White)
"Got to Give It Up" (Gorham, Lynott)
"Emerald" (Gorham, Robertson, Downey, Lynott)
"Killer on the Loose"
"The Boys Are Back in Town"
"Hollywood" (Gorham, Lynott)

Tracks 1,2 recorded live at Seneca College Fieldhouse, Toronto October 28, 1977

Tracks 3,4,6 recorded live at Dublin RDS Hall June 7, 1980

Track 5 recorded live at Hammersmith Odeon, London May 29, 1980

Tracks 7-10 recorded live in Britain 1983

Personnel
Phil Lynott – bass guitar, vocals
Brian Downey – drums, percussion
Scott Gorham – guitar, except tracks 8, 11, 18 & 19
Eric Bell – guitar on tracks 18 & 19
Brian Robertson – guitar on tracks 1–3, 5, 12 & 13
Gary Moore – guitar on tracks 4, 8, 10, 11 & 17
Snowy White – guitar on tracks 15 & 16
John Sykes – guitar on tracks 6 & 7
Darren Wharton – keyboards on tracks 6 & 7

Charts

Certifications

References

1996 greatest hits albums
Thin Lizzy compilation albums
Vertigo Records compilation albums
Mercury Records compilation albums